HQM may refer to:
 Bowerman Airport, in Hoquiam, Washington, United States
 Hatfield Quality Meats, an American meat packer
 HQM Sachsenring GmbH, a German autoparts manufacturer